Diogenes Alves de Miranda Junior, better known as Júnior Xuxa (born March 12, 1984), is a Brazilian football midfielder who last played for Murici.

References

External links
  Ogol
  Soccerway

1984 births
Living people
Association football forwards
Brazilian footballers
Santa Cruz Futebol Clube players
Ettifaq FC players
Saudi Professional League players
Treze Futebol Clube players
River Atlético Clube players
Murici Futebol Clube players
Vila Nova Futebol Clube players
Associação Desportiva Recreativa e Cultural Icasa players
ABC Futebol Clube players
Association football midfielders
People from Garanhuns
Sportspeople from Pernambuco